Ahmad Mahmoud Al-Sagheer is a Jordanian footballer, of Palestinian origin, who plays as a goalkeeper for Al-Hussein (Irbid) and Jordan U-22.

References

External links 
 

1992 births
Living people
Jordanian footballers
Jordan international footballers
Association football goalkeepers